The Royal Australian Navy (RAN) is the naval force of the Australian Defence Force (ADF). The professional head of the RAN is Chief of Navy (CN) Vice Admiral Mark Hammond AM, RAN. CN is also jointly responsible to the Minister of Defence (MINDEF) and the Chief of Defence Force (CDF). The Department of Defence as part of the Australian Public Service administers the ADF.

Formed in 1901, as the Commonwealth Naval Forces (CNF), through the amalgamation of the colonial navies of Australia following the federation of Australia. Although it was originally intended for local defence, it became increasingly responsible for regional defence as the British Empire started to diminish its influence in the South Pacific.

The Royal Australian Navy was initially a green-water navy, and where the Royal Navy provided a blue-water force to the Australian Squadron, which the Australian and New Zealand governments helped to fund, and that was assigned to the Australia Station. This period lasted until 1913, when naval ships purchased from Britain arrived, although the British Admiralty continued to provide blue-water defence capability in the Pacific and Indian Oceans up to the early years of the Second World War.

During its history, the Royal Australian Navy has participated in a number of major wars, including the First and Second World Wars, Korean War, Malayan Emergency, Indonesia-Malaysia Confrontation and the Vietnam War. Today, the RAN consists of 43 commissioned vessels, 4 non-commissioned vessels and over 16,000 personnel. The navy is one of the largest and most sophisticated naval forces in the South Pacific region, with a significant presence in the Indian Ocean and worldwide operations in support of military campaigns and peacekeeping missions.

History

Formation 
The Commonwealth Naval Forces were established on 1 March 1901, with the amalgamation of the six separate colonial naval forces, following the Federation of Australia. The Royal Australian Navy initially consisted of the former New South Wales, Victorian, Queensland, Western Australian, South Australian and Tasmanian ships and resources of their disbanded navies.

The Defence Act 1903 established the operation and command structure of the Royal Australian Navy. When policymakers sought to determine the newly established force's requirements and purpose, there were arguments about whether Australia's naval force would be structured mainly for local defence or designed to serve as a fleet unit within a larger imperial force, controlled centrally by the British Admiralty. In 1908–09, a compromise solution was pursued, with the Australian government agreeing to establish a force for local defence but that would be capable of forming a fleet unit within the Royal Navy, albeit without central control. As a result, the navy's force structure was set at "one battlecruiser, three light cruisers, six destroyers and three submarines". The first of the RAN's new vessels, the destroyer HMAS Yarra, was completed in September 1910, and by the outbreak of the First World War the majority of the planned fleet had been realised. On 10 July 1911, the CNF was granted "Royal" status by King George V

World War I

Pacific 
Following the declaration of war on the Central Powers, the British War Office tasked the capture of German New Guinea to the Australian Government. This was to deprive the Imperial German Navy's East Asia Squadron of regional intelligence by removing their access to wireless stations. On 11 August, three destroyers and HMAS Sydney prepared to engage the squadron at German Anchorages in New Guinea, which did not eventuate as the vessels were not present. Landing parties were placed on Rabaul and Herbertshohe to destroy its German wireless station; however, the objective was found to be further inland and an expeditionary force was required. Meanwhile, HMAS Australia was tasked with scouring the Pacific Ocean for the German squadron.

The Australian Naval and Military Expeditionary Force (ANMEF) began recruiting on the same day that the taskforce arrived in New Britain, and consisted of two battalions: one of 1,000 men, and the other with 500 serving and former seamen. On 19 August, the ANMEF departed Sydney for training in Townsville before the rendezvous with other RAN vessels in Port Moresby. On 29 August, four cruisers and HMAS Australia assisted the Samoa Expeditionary Force in landing at Apia, and committing a bloodless takeover of German Samoa. Additionally, the RAN captured German merchant vessels, disrupting German merchant shipping in the Pacific. On 7 September, the ANMEF, now including HMAS Australia, three destroyers, and two each of cruisers and submarines, departed for Rabaul.

A few days later, on 9 September, HMAS Melbourne landed a party to destroy the island's wireless station, though the German administration promptly surrendered. Between 11 and 12 September, landings were put ashore at Kabakaul, Rabaul and Herbertshohe; it was during this period that the first Australian casualties and deaths of the war occurred. On 14 September, HMAS Encounter barraged an enemy position at Toma with shells; it was the first time the RAN had fired upon an enemy and had shelled an inland location. On 17 September, German New Guinea surrendered to the encroaching ANMEF, with the overall campaign a success and exceeded the objectives set by the War Office. However, the RAN submarine HMAS AE1 became the first ever vessel of the new navy to be sunk. The Australian Squadron was placed under control of the British Admiralty, and was moreover tasked with protecting Australian shipping.

On 1 November, the RAN escorted the first Australian Imperial Force convoy from Albany, WA and set for the Khedivate of Egypt, which was soon to become the Sultanate of Egypt. On 9 November, HMAS Sydney began hunting for SMS Emden, a troublesome German coastal raider, which Sydney later destroyed. Following the almost complete destruction of the East Asia Squadron in the Battle of the Falklands by the Royal Navy, the RAN became able to be reassigned to other naval theatres of the war.

Atlantic and Mediterranean 
On 28 February 1915, the Royal Australian Naval Bridging Train (RANBT) was formed with members of the Royal Australian Naval Reserve who could not find billets in the RAN. Following the entrance of the Ottoman Empire in alliance with the Central Powers, HMAS AE2 was committed to the initial naval operation of the Gallipoli campaign. After the failure of the naval strategy, an amphibious assault was planned to enable the Allies' warships to pass through the Dardanelles and capture Constantinople. The RANBT was sent ashore, along with the invasion, for engineering duties.

Later in the war, most of the RAN's major ships operated as part of Royal Navy forces in the Mediterranean and North Seas, and then later in the Adriatic, and then the Black Sea following the surrender of the Ottoman Empire.

Interwar years 
In 1919, the RAN received a force of six destroyers, three sloops and six submarines from the Royal Navy, but throughout the 1920s and early 1930s, the RAN was drastically reduced in size due to a variety of factors including political apathy and economic hardship as a result of the Great Depression. In this time the focus of Australia's naval policy shifted from defence against invasion to trade protection, and several fleet units were sunk as targets or scrapped. By 1923, the size of the navy had fallen to eight vessels, and by the end of the decade it had fallen further to five, with just 3,500 personnel. In the late 1930s, as international tensions increased, the RAN was modernised and expanded, with the service receiving primacy of funding over the Army and Air Force during this time as Australia began to prepare for war.

World War II 
Early in the Second World War, RAN ships again operated as part of Royal Navy formations, many serving with distinction in the Mediterranean, the Red Sea, the Persian Gulf, the Indian Ocean, and off the West African coast. Following the outbreak of the Pacific War and the virtual destruction of Allied naval forces in Southeast Asia, the RAN operated more independently, defending against Axis naval activity in Australian waters, or participating in United States Navy offensives. As the navy took on an even greater role, it was expanded significantly and at its height the RAN was the fourth-largest navy in the world, with 39,650 personnel operating 337 warships, but no active submarines. A total of 34 vessels were lost during the war, including three cruisers and four destroyers.

Post war to present 
After the Second World War, the size of the RAN was again reduced, but it gained new capabilities with the acquisition of two aircraft carriers, Sydney and Melbourne. The RAN saw action in many Cold War–era conflicts in the Asia-Pacific region and operated alongside the Royal Navy and United States Navy off Korea, Malaysia, and Vietnam. Since the end of the Cold War, the RAN has been part of Coalition forces in the Persian Gulf and Indian Ocean, operating in support of Operation Slipper and undertaking counter piracy operations. It was also deployed in support of Australian peacekeeping operations in East Timor and the Solomon Islands.

The high demand for personnel in the Second World War led to the establishment of the Women's Royal Australian Naval Service (WRANS) branch in 1942, where over 3,000 women served in shore-based positions. The WRANS was disbanded in 1947, but then re-established in 1951 during the Cold War. It was given permanent status in 1959, and the RAN was the final branch to integrate women in the Australian military in 1985.

Structure

Command structure
The strategic command structure of the RAN was overhauled during the New Generation Navy changes. The RAN is commanded through Naval Headquarters (NHQ) in Canberra.  NHQ is responsible for implementing policy decisions handed down from the Department of Defence and for overseeing tactical and operational issues that are the purview of the subordinate commands.

Beneath NHQ are two subordinate commands:
 Fleet Command: fleet command is led by Commander Australian Fleet (COMAUSFLT). COMAUSFLT holds the rank of rear admiral; previously, this post was Flag Officer Commanding HM's Australian Fleet (FOCAF), created in 1911, but the title was changed in 1988 to the Maritime Commander Australia. On 1 February 2007, the title changed again, becoming Commander Australian Fleet. The nominated at-sea commander is Commodore Warfare (COMWAR), a one-star deployable task group commander. Fleet command has responsibility to CN for the full command of assigned assets, and to Joint Operations command for the provision of operationally ready forces.
 Navy Strategic Command: the administrative element overseeing the RAN's training, engineering and logistical support needs. Instituted in 2000, the Systems Commander was appointed at the rank of commodore; in June 2008, the position was upgraded to the rank of rear admiral.

Fleet Command was previously made up of seven Force Element Groups, but after the New Generation Navy changes, this was restructured into four Force Commands:
 Fleet Air Arm (previously known as the Australian Navy Aviation Group), responsible for the navy's aviation assets and capability. As of 2018, the FAA consists of two front line helicopter squadrons (one focused on anti-submarine and anti-shipping warfare and the other a transport unit), two training squadrons and a trials squadron.
 Mine Warfare, Clearance Diving, Hydrographic, Meteorological and Patrol Forces, an amalgamation of the previous Patrol Boat, Hydrographic, and Mine Warfare and Clearance Diving Forces, operating what are collectively termed the RAN's "minor war vessels"
 Submarine Force, (Royal Australian Navy Submarine Service) operating the s
 Surface Force, covering the RAN's surface combatants (generally ships of frigate size or larger)

Fleet
The Royal Australian Navy consists of nearly 50 commissioned vessels and over 16,000 personnel. Ships commissioned into the RAN are given the prefix HMAS (His/Her Majesty's Australian Ship).

Clearance Diving Branch

The Clearance Diving Branch is composed of two Clearance Diving Teams (CDT) that serve as parent units for naval clearance divers:
 Clearance Diving Team 1 (AUSCDT ONE), based at HMAS Waterhen in New South Wales; and
 Clearance Diving Team 4 (AUSCDT FOUR), based at HMAS Stirling in Western Australia.

When clearance divers are sent into combat, Clearance Diving Team Three (AUSCDT THREE) is formed.

The CDTs have two primary roles:
 Mine counter-measures (MCM) and explosive ordnance disposal (EOD); and
 Maritime tactical operations.

Personnel

, the RAN has 15,285 permanent full-time personnel, 161 gap year personnel, and 3,932 reserve personnel. The permanent full-time trained force consisted of 2,914 commissioned officers, and 10,056 enlisted personnel. In June 2021, male personnel made up 73% of the permanent full-time force, while female personnel made up 23%. The RAN has the second-highest percentage of women in the permanent forces, compared to the RAAF's 25.5% and the Army's 15.1%.

The following are some of the current senior Royal Australian Navy officers:
 Vice Admiral David Johnston – Vice Chief of the Defence Force
 Vice Admiral Mark Hammond – Chief of Navy
Vice Admiral Jonathan Mead – Chief Nuclear-Powered Submarine Taskforce
 Rear Admiral Jonathan Earley – Deputy Chief of Navy
 Rear Admiral Christopher Smith – Commander Australian Fleet
Rear Admiral Matthew Buckley – Head Nuclear-Powered Submarine Capability
 Rear Admiral Peter Quinn – Head Navy Capability
 Rear Admiral Kath Richards – Head Navy Engineering
 Rear Admiral Bruce Kafer – Director-General Australian Navy Cadets and Reserves
 Commodore Brett Brace – Hydrographer of Australia
 Warrant Officer Deb Butterworth – Warrant Officer of the Navy

Ranks and uniforms

Commissioned Officers
Commissioned officers of the Australian Navy have pay grades ranging from S-1 to O-11. The only O-11 position in the navy is honorary and has only ever been held by royalty, most recently being held by The Duke of Edinburgh as the Lord High Admrial of the United Kingdom. The highest rank achievable in the current Royal Australian Navy structure is O-10, an admiral who serves as the Chief of the Defence Force (CDF) when the position is held by a Naval Officer.

O-8 (rear admiral) to O-11 (admiral of the fleet) are referred to as flag officers, O-5 (commander) and above are referred to as senior officers, while S-1 (midshipman) to O-4 (lieutenant commander) are referred to as junior officers. All RAN Officers are issue a commission by the Governor General of Australia as Commander-in-Chief on behalf of His Majesty King Charles III, King of Australia.

Naval officers are trained at the Royal Australian Naval College (HMAS Creswell) in Jervis Bay as well as the Australian Defence Force Academy in Canberra.

Sailors

Rate Insignia 

Royal Australian Navy Other Ranks wear "right arm rates" insignia, called "Category Insignia" to indicate specialty training qualifications. This is a holdover from the Royal Navy.

Special insignia
The Warrant Officer of the Navy (WO-N) is an appointment held by the most senior sailor in the RAN and holds the rank of warrant officer (WO). However, the WO-N does not wear the WO rank insignia; instead, they wear the special insignia of the appointment. The WO-N appointment has similar equivalent appointments in the other services, each holding the rank of warrant officer, each being the most senior sailor/soldier/airman in that service, and each wearing their own special insignia rather than their rank insignia. The Australian Army equivalent is the Regimental Sergeant Major of the Army (RSM-A) and the Royal Australian Air Force equivalent is the Warrant Officer of the Air Force (WOFF-AF).

Religious and Spiritual Officers 
Chaplains in the Royal Australian Navy are commissioned officers who complete the same training as other officers in the RAN at the Royal Australian Naval College, HMAS Creswell. From July 2020, Maritime Spiritual Wellbeing Officers (MSWOs) were introduced to the Navy Chaplaincy Branch, designed to give Navy people and their families with professional, non-religious pastoral care and spiritual support.

RAN regulations group RAN Chaplains and MSWOs with Commanders for purposes of protocol such as marks of respect (saluting); however, have no other rank other than the notional rank of "Chaplain" or "MSWO" respectively. From January 2021, MSWOs and all chaplains will wear the branch's new non-faith-specific rank insignia of a fouled anchor overlaying a compass rose, which represents a united team front, encompassing all faiths and purpose. Faith Chaplains will have insignia that reflect their religion on collar mounted patches (Cross for Christian, Crescent for Muslim etc) Senior Chaplains and MSWOs are grouped with captains, and Principal Chaplains and MSWOs are grouped with Commodores, but their rank slide remains the same. Principal Chaplains and MSWOs, however, have gold braid on the peak of their white service cap.

Ships and equipment

Current ships 

The RAN currently operates 42 commissioned vessels, made up of nine ship classes and three individual ships, plus four non-commissioned vessels. In addition, DMS Maritime operates a large number of civilian-crewed vessels under contract to the Australian Defence Force.

Fleet Air Arm

Small arms 
RAN personnel utilise the following small arms:
 EF88 Austeyr
 F89A1 Minimi
Browning Hi-Power
870P Shotgun
M2HB-QCB
M4A1 carbine
MAG 58

Future 

There are currently several major projects underway that will see upgrades to RAN capabilities:
Project SEA 1180 Phase 1 is building twelve s based on the Lürssen OPV80 design, to replace Armidale-class patrol boats. Construction started in November 2018, with the first vessel, HMAS Arafura to enter service in 2022.
 Project SEA 1654 Phase 3 acquired two  replenishment ships based on the Spanish Cantabria-class oiler. HMAS Supply was launched in November 2018 and replaced , while the second, HMAS Stalwart replaced HMAS Sirius.
Project SEA 5000 Phase 1 is acquiring nine s based on the British Type 26 Global Combat Ship, to replace the Anzac-class frigates in the late 2020s. The vessels will be built in Adelaide by BAE Systems, with the first three to be named HMA Ships Hunter, Flinders and Tasman.
Project SEA 1445 Phase 1 is the acquisition of eight evolved  patrol boats to built by Austal in Henderson.
Project SEA 1905 is the acquisition of a further two Arafura-class offshore patrol vessels in a mine counter-measures configuration.
Project SEA 2400 is the Hydrographic Data Collection Capability Program which includes the introduction of a Strategic Military Survey Capability (SMSB) to replace the Leeuwin-class survey vessels.
Project SEA 2200 is the acquisition of two Joint Support Ships to replace HMAS Choules and enhance the logistical support of the RAN.

Submarines 
Project SEA 1429 Phase 2 is upgrading the s with the Mk48 Mod 7 CBASS torpedo. Initial Operational Capability (IOC) was achieved in May 2008 with Final Operational Capability (FOC) due in December 2018, 60 months late.
Project SEA 1439 Phase 3 is upgrading the Collins-class submarine platform systems to improve 'reliability, sustainability, safety and capability'. IOC was achieved in October 2007, FOC is due in September 2022.
Project SEA 1439 Phase 4A is replacing the Collins-class submarines' combat system with the AN/BYG-1(V)8 developed in conjunction with the US Navy IOC Expected to achieve Final Operating Capability in December 2018. IOC was in May 2008 with FOC planned for December 2018.
 Project SEA 1000: In September 2021, Prime Minister Scott Morrison announced that Australia had canceled its contract with French shipbuilder Naval Group for 12  diesel-electric submarines based on the French  nuclear-powered submarine that were to replace the Collins class. 
 SSN-AUKUS: In March 2023, Prime Minister Anthony Albanese announced that Australia would build eight nuclear-powered SSN-AUKUS submarines at Osborne Naval Shipyard. The UK Submersible Ship Nuclear Replacement (SSNR) design was renamed SSN-AUKUS in March 2023, under the AUKUS trilateral security pact, when Australia joined the project and additional US technology was incorporated into the design. The construction of the first boat is to begin by the end of the 2030s with the boat delivered in the early 2040s. 
 : In March 2023, Prime Minister Anthony Albanese announced that Australia intends to purchase three nuclear-powered Virginia class submarines from the US, subject to congressional approval, to ensure there is no capability gap as the RAN transitions to the SSN-AUKUS. The first boat is planned to be delivered in 2033. If there are delays with the SSN-AUKUS class program, Australia has the option of purchasing up to two additional Virginia class boats.
 East coast base: In March 2022, Prime Minister Scott Morrison announced that a "new submarine base will be built on the east coast of Australia" and "three preferred locations on the east coast have been identified, being Brisbane, Newcastle, and Port Kembla".

Current operations 

The RAN currently has forces deployed on three major operations:
 Operation Resolute: border protection and fisheries patrol.
 Operation Manitou: counter-piracy, counterterrorism and maritime stability in the Middle East and
 Operation Accordion: support operation to provide sustainment to forces deployed on Operation Manitou.

See also
 Australian Navy Cadets
 Australian White Ensign
 Battle and theatre honours of the Royal Australian Navy
 Royal Australian Navy School of Underwater Medicine
List of ships of the Royal Australian Navy

References

Notes

Bibliography

External links

 Royal Australian Navy home page
 Historical listing of RAN ships
 Maritimequest Royal Australian Navy photo gallery
 Biographies of senior RAN officers
 Royal and Dominion Navies in World War II, Campaigns, Battles, Warship losses
 ADF Pay & Conditions Manual – Equivalent ranks and classifications

 
1901 establishments in Australia
Military units and formations established in 1901
Organisations based in Australia with royal patronage